Bhangura or Bhangoora  is an upazila of Pabna District in the Division of Rajshahi, Bangladesh.

History
Bhangura thana was established in 1980 and was turned into an upazila in 1981. Once Bhangura upazila was a noted jute growing area. For this reason a jute trading company called Chittagong Jute Company established business house on the bank of the river adjacent to the Baral Bridge. Still there exist a house of the extinct company.

Liberation War
During the liberation war several encounters between Pakistan Army & Razakars and Mukti Bahini were made at Baral Bridge and Dilpashar Bridge. A number of Razakars surrendered. Commander Abdul Hannan and Aslamul Islam led the Mukti Bahini.

Abu Muhammad Yunus Ali was elected Member of Legislative Assembly (MLA) from Atgharia-Chatmohor-Faridpur constituency of Pabna district. He was nominated by Awami League in the United Front election in 1954, and became the founder and main leader of the Awami League party politics in that area. He was also a popular language soldier, a close associate of Bangabandhu in the six-point demand movement, and an organizer of the 1971 Liberation War. He was a close friend of Bangabandhu Sheikh Mujibur Rahman, his only roommate in Baker Hostel in Kolkata, a classmate at Dhaka University and also a trusted political companion.

Abu Muhammad Yunus Ali served as an organizer of the liberation war in Shahzadpur, Baghabari, Nagarbari and in the remote areas of Chalanbil of Greater Pabna district in 1971, and was wounded in a battlefield. At one stage, the members of Razakar-Al-Badr force tortured him in an inhuman manner, and even destroyed his ancestral homestead at Sartutia of Bhangura upazila. In 1972, after the government treatment of his injury under the supervision of Bangabandhu, he gained limited mobility after surgery. On February 14, 2005, the “People’s MLA Yunus” breathed his last in his house at Bhangura.

Geography
It has 14,201 households and total area 120.2 km2. It is bounded by Tarash upazila on the north, Faridpur (Pabna) upazila on the south, Ullapara upazila on the east, Chatmohar upazila on the west. The upazila is criss-crossed by two rivers named the Baral and the Gumani. The western part of this upazila is relatively higher than the eastern part which comprises a part of the great Chalan Bil. A very large number of small bills are also available in this area. The people here like the simple life.

Demographics
At the 2001 Bangladesh census, Bhangura had a population of 99,474 of which 50,486 were male and 48,988 were female. Average density of population was 731 per square kilometre. It had an average literacy rate of 38.3% (7+ years).

Main Occupations Agriculture but, agricultural labourer, wage labourer, commerce, service, fishing and others also present.

Economy
Total cultivable land 10,460 hectares, fallow land 2,786 hectares; single crop 36%, double crop 40% and treble crop 24%. The market value of the land of the first grade is about 7500 Taka per 0.01 hectare.

Main crops are Paddy, jute, wheat, onion, garlic, green chilly, khesari, musur and patal. Main fruits are Banana, mango, jackfruit, black berry, papaya and litchi. Extinct or nearly extinct crops are barley, chhola, kaun, china and bhura.

Other agriculture activities dairy 312, poultry 60, fishery 2. Bhangura upazila is notable for its milk and milk products. A number of people are involved in production of milk products that include butter, chern, chhana, sweets, etc. These products as well as raw materials are sent to different parts of Bangladesh. Several milk collection and chilling centres of different companies such as Milk Vita, BRAK, Amomilk, Akiz are actively present in this upazila.

Points of interest
A part of Chalan Beel has passed through the northern part of the Upazila. It has a wonderful Upazila Parishad including a well-decorated Dak-Bangla.
Three-domed mosque at Kazipara (Chandipur), Baral Bridge, Boro Bil, Pathorghata four-storied Jame Mosque, Patul Playground, Patul Excursion Beach 
Sonali Beach (kalikadah, Boro Bil),
Nobi bari (Moydan dighi Noton rasta),
Baonjan Dhow (famous for fishing).

Administration
Bhangura Upazila is divided into Bhangura Municipality and five union parishads: Austa Manisha, Bhangura, Dilpashar, Khanmarich, and Parbhanguria. The union parishads are subdivided into 67 mauzas and 122 villages.

Bhangura Municipality is subdivided into 9 wards and 37 mahallas.

Member of the Parliament (MP): Mokbul Hossain (Pabna-3 constitution)

Chairman: মোঃ বাকি বিল্লাহ্

Vice Chairman: 
মোঃ গোলাম হাফিজ

Woman Vice Chairman: 
মোছাঃ আজিদা খাতুন

Upazila Nirbahi Officer (UNO): 
নাহিদ হাসান খান

Bhangura Paurashava Mayor: Md.Golam Hasnain Rasel

Transport
Roads pucca 13 km, semi pucca 4 km and mud road 210 km; waterways ; railways 11 km. Bus and train is the most popular means of transport for communication with other parts of the country. There are three railway stations in this upazila: Baral Bridge, Bhangura and Sharatnagar of them Baral Bridge is the most prominent one where several intercity trains have stoppage, which are: Silk City, Lalmoni, Dhumketu, Sundarban, Chitra etc. Bus services are: Shahzadpur Travels (Bhangura-Dhaka), Syamoli Paribahan (Bhangura-Chittagong), Uttara Paribahan (Bhangura-Rajshahi), B-Nagar (Bhangura-Bogra) and direct bus services also exist from Bhangura to Pabna, Ishurdi, Kushtia, Baghabari (Sirajgonj) etc.
Traditional transport Palanquin, dhuli, horse carriage and bullock cart. These means of transport are either extinct or nearly extinct.

Education
Average literacy 26.1%; male 31.7%, female 20.2%. Educational institutions: college 7, collegiate school 0, secondary school 11, madrasa 2, government primary school 47, non-government primary school 00, satellite school 13, community school 3. Noted educational institutes are 
 Bhangura Union High School, 
 Bhangura Jarina Rahim Girls High School, 
 Hazi Jamal Uddin College, 
 Bhangura Girls College, 
 Sharatnagar Fazil Madrasa, 
 Bharamara Udayan Academy, 
 Kashipur Government Primary School, 
 Patulipara High School, 
 Bhangura technical and business management college  
 Baral Kindergarten, Shishu Tirtho, 
 Bhangura Biggan School & College, 
 Momotaz Mostafa Ideal School & College,.
 Bhangura Model School & College
 Bhangura Public School & College
 Dearpara government primary school 
 Dearpara dakhil madrasa 
 Sarutia government primary school
 B.B High School & college.
 B.B Dakhil Madrasa
 Pass Betuan Govt. Primary School

Media
Sachetan

References
com Bhangura Upazila Community Website Bhangura Upazila Govt. Web Portal

 
Upazilas of Pabna District